Chris Disspain was a Director of ICANN (Internet Corporation for Assigned Names and Numbers) for 9 years (2011-2020), serving for a time as its Vice-Chair.

He was the first Chair of ICANN's country-code top-level domain organization (ccNSO) in 2004 and served in that role until 2011.. He was instrumental in developing the policies enabling the first use of non-Latin scripts in top-level domains.

From 2000 until 2016 he was CEO of auDA, the independent governing body/manager of and the policy body governing the Australian Internet Domain Name Space.

In 2005 he set up The auDA Foundation, a charitable trust to promote and encourage educational and research activities that  enhance the utility of the Internet for the benefit of the Australian community. He was the Foundation chair from 2005 to 2016.

From 2006 to 2013 Disspain was a member of the United Nations Secretary-General's Internet Governance Multi- Stakeholder Advisory Group.

From 2013 to 2016 he was a director of the Internet Society of Australia.

In 1995 he co-authored  the book Create Your Fuller Life Map, focused on improving personal performance through goal setting.

Disspain is a corporate lawyer and has held executive management positions and directorships in private and public companies in the U.K. and Australia. These companies have included those involved in mining, e-commerce and the Internet.

References

External links 
 http://www.icann.org/
 http://www.ccnso.icann.org/
 http://www.auda.org.au/

Australian businesspeople
Living people
Year of birth missing (living people)
Place of birth missing (living people)